The 2012–13 West Bank Premier League was the 10th season of the top division in the West Bank, Palestine, and the 5th since the league became a yearly competition in 2008. It started on 31 August 2012 and finished on 4 May 2013. The defending champions are Hilal Al-Quds, who won their first title the season before.

Teams
This season, the league has expanded from 10 to 12 teams. As a result, 4 teams (Ahli Al-Khaleel, Hilal Areeha, Islami Qalqilya and Jenin) were promoted from the West Bank First League while only 2 teams (Thaqafi Tulkarem and Markaz Tulkarem) were relegated.

Final standings

References

West Bank Premier League seasons
1
West